Edward Christopher Tate (December 22, 1860 – June 25, 1932) was a 19th-century Major League Baseball catcher. He played from 1885 to 1890 with the Boston Beaneaters and the Baltimore Orioles. He played in the minors from 1894 to 1897.

Tate Field in Richmond, Virginia was renamed in honor of Tate in 1926.

References

External links
 

1860 births
1932 deaths
19th-century baseball players
Major League Baseball catchers
Boston Beaneaters players
Baltimore Orioles (AA) players
Richmond Virginians (minor league) players
Lebanon Cedars players
Winston-Salem Blue Sluggers players
Richmond Crows players
Norfolk Clams players
Norfolk Crows players
Portsmouth Truckers players
Sunbury Pirates players
Roanoke Magicians players
Norfolk Jewels players
Baseball players from Richmond, Virginia
Baltimore Orioles (Atlantic Association) players